Glen Jackson may refer to:

Glen Jackson (rugby union) (born 1975), former New Zealand rugby union player, subsequently an international referee
Glen Jackson (Canadian football) (born 1954), Canadian Football League player
Glen Jackson (curler)

See also
Glenn Jackson (1902–1980), businessman and transportation planner in the U.S. state of Oregon